Harris Creek may refer to:

Harris Creek (British Columbia)
Harris Creek (Baltimore), passes beneath Canton, Baltimore in a culvert
Harris Creek (Maryland)
Harris Creek (Missouri)
Harris Creek (Montana), a stream in Flathead County, Montana
Harris Creek (Valley River tributary), a stream in Cherokee County, North Carolina

See also
Harris Branch (disambiguation)